The men's +95 kg competition in judo at the 1988 Summer Olympics in Seoul was held on 1 October at the Jangchung Gymnasium. The gold medal was won by Hitoshi Saito of Japan.

Results

Pool A

Pool B

Repechages

Final

Final classification

References

External links
 

Judo at the 1988 Summer Olympics
Judo at the Summer Olympics Men's Heavyweight
Men's events at the 1988 Summer Olympics